Jérôme Schuster (born 29 June 1985 in Perpignan) is a professional French rugby union prop currently playing for Tarbes in the Pro D2. He made his international debut for France against Fiji in November 2010. He can play on both sides of the scrum, but usually plays at loosehead.

On May 17, 2013, Schuster signed with the Leicester Tigers for the 2013-14 season. On 22 May 2014, Schuster returns to France as he signs for Tarbes, who compete in the Pro D2.

References

External links
Statistics from It's Rugby
USA Perpginan profile

French rugby union players
France international rugby union players
USA Perpignan players
Sportspeople from Perpignan
1985 births
Living people
Leicester Tigers players
Rugby union props